Treaty of Serav was a treaty between Ottoman Empire and Safavid Persia after the war of 1615–1618. (signed on 26 September 1618 in Sarab)

Background 

By the treaty of Nasuh Pasha in 1612 Ottoman Empire had agreed to turn back Caucasus and Northwest Iran to Safavid Persia. Safavid Empire on the other hand agreed to pay an annual tribute of 200 loads of silk as a part of reparations. However, Shah Abbas I the Great of Persia refused to pay the tribute. The war renewed in 1615.

The war 

The Ottoman commander in chief Grand Vizier Öküz Kara Mehmed Pasha tried to capture Yerevan (modern Armenia) which was recently abandoned by the treaty of Nasuh Pasha, but he lifted the siege after 44 days as no improvements were booked. The target of the next commander in chief Damat Halil Pasha was Ardabil. This time Abbas sued for peace.

The terms 
The terms of the treaty was similar to those of treaty of Nasuh Pasha with several minor rectifications of the border line. Also, the annual tribute of the Persian side was reduced from 200 loads to 100 loads.

Aftermath 
This treaty proved that a stalemate between Ottoman Empire and Safavid Persia had been reached and neither side might gain substantial territories in the long run. In the following decades there were times when the Ottomans succeeded to storm Tabriz, and there were times when the Persians successfully captured Baghdad. But these victories were all temporary and the balance of power between the two states continued up to the 20th century.

See also 
 Treaty of Zuhab
 Treaty of Kerden

References

Sources
 
 
 

1618 in Asia
1618 in law
Serav
Serav
Serav
17th century in Iran
Ottoman–Persian Wars
1618 in the Ottoman Empire